George Henry Bretz, later Brett, (September 3, 1880 – May 7, 1956) was a Canadian lacrosse player who competed in the 1904 Summer Olympics. In 1904 he was member of the Shamrock Lacrosse Team which won the gold medal in the lacrosse tournament.

References

External links
 

1880 births
Canadian lacrosse players
Lacrosse players at the 1904 Summer Olympics
Olympic gold medalists for Canada
Olympic lacrosse players of Canada
1956 deaths
Medalists at the 1904 Summer Olympics
Olympic medalists in lacrosse